The Godfather Papers and Other Confessions is a 1972 collective autobiography written by Mario Puzo, on his journey through writing his 1969 novel The Godfather.
"I was forty-five years old and tired of being an artist. Besides, I owed $20,000 to relatives, finance companies, banks and assorted bookmakers and shylocks. It was really time to grow up and sell out as Lenny Bruce once advised. So I told my editors, OK, I'll write a book about the Mafia..."
It explains Puzo's reasoning for writing The Godfather:
"I have written three novels. The Godfather is not as good as the preceding two; I wrote it to make money..."

American autobiographies
Literary autobiographies
Books by Mario Puzo
Non-fiction books about The Godfather
1972 books